Elections to the French National Assembly were held in the Comoros on 21 October 1945. The territory elected a single seat, won by Saïd Mohamed Cheikh.

Results

References

Comoros
October 1945 events in Africa
Elections in the Comoros
1945 in the Comoros
Comoros